Lex talionis is a Latin phrase meaning law of retaliation. It is a principle developed in early Babylonian law and is also present in the Bible as "an eye for an eye". It may also refer to:

Law
 Declaration of Lex Talionis — developed during the First English Civil War (1642–1646) as practical—rather than moral—mutual restraint by the parties to the war on how they treated prisoners of war
 Lex Talionis Fraternitas  Inc. Sodalitas Ducum Futurorum — an exclusive fraternal organization of Filipino jurists, legal practitioners, and law students founded on September 28, 1969

Arts
Lex Talionis (1989) — an album by English neofolk band Sol Invictus
Lex Talionis (1994) — an album by American death metal band Acheron
 Lex Talionis (2016) — a Bollywood film starring  Akash Dhar and Anya Singh